On 13 January 2021 around 200 rebels from Coalition of Patriots for Change attacked Bangui, the capital of the Central African Republic, in an attempt to overthrow the government which resulted in failure.

Background 
In December 2020 major rebel groups in Central African Republic created Coalition of Patriots for Change. They were led by former president François Bozizé. They tried to prevent organization of 2020–21 Central African general election.

According to testimonies by members of armed groups Francois Bozize was directly involved in preparation and coordination of attack on Bangui. Karim Meckassoua, former president of National Assembly was also involved in preparations in coordination with Bozize, Noureddine Adam, Ali Darassa and several MPC generals. According to testimonies he was hoping that if coup d’état was successful he would be head of transitional government. However Bozize was convinced that Meckassoua was trying to double-cross him which lead to refusal of Bangui-based Anti-balaka fighters to join the attack. They were supposed to create chaos in Bangui which would allow other fighters to enter the capital. Meckassoua however denied all accusations.

Battle 

Around 5:45 am around ten rebels armed with rocket launchers and Kalashnikov rifles were spotted in PK 11, Damala, PK 12 and Pindao in Bangui. Around 200 rebels attacked military barracks 9 km and 12 km from the capital. They also attacked Bimbo neighborhood. Residents were reporting gunfire in different parts of the city. Streets were scattered with bullet casings. The attack was repelled and as of 8 am situation in the city was calm. One Rwandan soldier was killed and another was injured. According to prime minister Firmin Ngrébada 30 rebels were killed and five were captured. A few civilians were injured including France Beldo, 31 year old woman hit by stray bullet into hand, chest and shoulder.

One of captured rebels was showed live on television. Interior minister Henri Wanzet Linguissara claimed that he was a Chadian citizen. The Chadian government denied the accusation.

References 

Central African Republic Civil War
2021 in the Central African Republic
Battles in 2021